The Somerset Archives and Local Studies holds the archives for the county of Somerset, England. The archives are held at Brunel Way, Langford Mead, Norton Fitzwarren, Taunton, and run by Somerset County Council.

The records held include oral history recordings, estate and manorial records, parish registers and the archives of the Somerset Light Infantry and Avon and Somerset Constabulary.

Management of the archives has been taken over by a charity, the South West Heritage Trust.

See also 

 Bath Record Office

References

External links 

 
 Somerset Heritage Centre at the ARCHON Directory, National Archives

Archives in Somerset
Organisations based in Taunton
History of Somerset
County record offices in England